Tompkins Harrison Matteson was an American painter born in Peterboro, New York, in 1813. Matteson studied at the National Academy of Design and was inspired by the works of William Sidney Mount. Matteson's paintings are known for their historical, patriotic, and religious themes. One of his most famous paintings is Justice's Court in the Back Woods.

Tompkins ran a studio in New York City from 1841 to 1850. He died in Sherburne, New York, in 1884.

Gallery of works

Further reading
Tuckerman, Henry T. Book of the Artists: American Artist Life. New York: G. P. Putnam and Sons, 1867.

References

1813 births
1884 deaths
19th-century American painters
American male painters
Artists from New York (state)
People from Peterboro, New York
National Academy of Design alumni
19th-century American male artists